Khimlasa is a town in Khurai City, Madhya Pradesh, India. It is currently in Khurai tehsil.
 
Cities and towns in Sagar district
Khurai